Mõisaküla ("manor village") may refer to several places in Estonia:

Mõisaküla, town in Viljandi County
Mõisaküla, Harju County, village in Kiili Parish, Harju County
Mõisaküla, Jõgeva County, village in Pajusi Parish, Jõgeva County
Mõisaküla, Hanila Parish, village in Hanila Parish, Lääne County
Mõisaküla, Lääne-Nigula Parish, village in Lääne-Nigula Parish, Lääne County
Mõisaküla, Pärnu County, village in Halinga Parish, Pärnu County
Mõisaküla, Muhu Parish, village in Muhu Parish, Saare County
Mõisaküla, Saare County, village in Lääne-Saare Parish, Saare County
Mõisaküla, Salme Parish, village in Salme Parish, Saare County
Mõisaküla, Torgu Parish, village in Torgu Parish, Saare County